Kanzeon Zen Center was a Zen Buddhist center located in Salt Lake City, Utah. It was an affiliate of the White Plum Asanga, an association of Zen centers stemming from the tradition of Taizan Maezumi. The founder and Abbot of Kanzeon Zen Center was Dennis Genpo Merzel Roshi, who resigned in 2011 amidst controversy. Kanzeon Zen Center was the home temple and the hub of Kanzeon Sangha International, founded by Genpo Roshi in 1984, with affiliate teachers, centers and groups in the US and seven European countries.
The center was housed at 1274 E. South Temple, a historic building listed as a contributing property in the South Temple Historic District. It closed in the wake of the sex scandals involving Merzel. News reports stated that the center was deeply financially in debt to Merzel.

Gallery

See also
Buddhism in the United States
Timeline of Zen Buddhism in the United States

References

External links

 Kanzeon Zen Center

Buddhist temples in the United States
Religious buildings and structures in Salt Lake City
White Plum Asanga
Buddhism in Utah
Zen centers in the United States
Temples in Utah
Religious organizations established in 1984
1984 establishments in Utah
Asian-American culture in Utah